The Zenroren National Union of General Workers (Zenroren Zenkokuippan) is a general union in Japan.

The union's origins lie in the National Union of General Workers (Zenkokuippan), an affiliate of the General Council of Trade Unions of Japan (Sohyo).  In 1989, Sohyo merged into Japanese Trade Union Confederation, but a substantial minority of members disagreed with this.  They split away from Zenkokuippan, and formed a new National Union of General Workers, which affiliated to the National Confederation of Trade Unions (Zenroren).  On founding, the union had 35,203 members.  By 2019, membership had fallen to 22,052.

References

General unions
Trade unions established in 1989
Trade unions in Japan